Glenn Belverio (born 1975) is an American journalist and editor based in New York, New York.

In the 1990s, Belverio was a filmmaker and performance artist, whose 1993 collaboration with best-selling author Camille Paglia on the short film Glennda and Camille Do Downtown, gained international attention. The film played at the Sundance Film Festival and won first prize for best short documentary at the Chicago Underground Film Festival.

In this and other films of the 1990s, Belverio appeared on screen in the drag persona of Glennda Orgasm. Laurence Senelick, writing about female impersonation in "The Cambridge Guide to Theater", said that Belverio's performances as Glennda represented a radical edge in gay culture at the time, "as the politically correct gay community turned its back on drag."  Through these performances, Belverio was thought to be engaging in the kind of political and cultural critique that Paglia termed "drag queen feminism".

In 1996 a retrospective of Belverio's film and video work was held at Institute of Contemporary Arts in London, and marked the end of his career as a filmmaker.  Shortly thereafter, his articles on the New York fashion scene began appearing in various publications such as Dutch, Zoo, i-D, Index, and Glue. Belverio has been a guest-editor and writer for the Asian culture and fashion magazine WestEast and worked between China and New York from 2002 to 2004. He won the award for editorial excellence from the Society of Publishers for his work on WestEast'''s "POP" and "SEX" issues in 2003.

His book "Confessions from the Velvet Ropes: The Glamorous, Grueling Life of Thomas Onorato, New York's Top Club Doorman" was published by St. Martin's Press in summer 2006. Rob Sheffield of Rolling Stone wrote: "Confessions from the Velvet Ropes is like a surreal mash-up of Party Girl and Apocalypse Now, or Please Kill Me and Night of the Living Dead. It's packed with absurdly juicy war stories from the velvet goldmine of New York clubland, down and dirty yet screamingly funny tales from the door-bitch jungle, full of crazed revelers, wasted starlets, fashion pimps, and sex behind the ice machine. Brilliant stuff."

Belverio was a guest on ABC News Now in December 2006 to discuss his book. Currently, he is a regular contributor to Diane Pernet's blog "A Shaded View on Fashion".

BooksConfessions from the Velvet Ropes: The Glamorous, Grueling Life of Thomas Onorato, New York's Top Club Doorman (2006) Vamps and Tramps by Camille Paglia (1994) (transcript of Glennda and Camille Do Downtown)Anti-Gay by Mark Simpson (1996) (transcript of A Case for the Closet'', co-written by Belverio and Bruce LaBruce)

External links
Official website for Confessions from the Velvet Ropes
Feature on Daniel Johnston by Glenn Belverio
Glenn Belverio's interview with '60s supermodel Veruschka
Glenn Belverio's coverage of 080 Barcelona Fashion Spring/Summer 2011
Glenn Belverio's review of New York Fashion Week in The Japan Times
Belverio interviews fashion designer Miguel Adrover for INDEX Magazine
Belverio and Camille Paglia on Jacqueline Susann in Salon Magazine
Paco's Return by Glenn Belverio; article in The Robb Report on Paco Rabanne
Photo essay on Nashville by Glenn Belverio
Belverio on Bollywood superstar Hrithik Roshan

Living people
American gay writers
American drag queens
Journalists from New York City
1975 births